The Shohada Shahr-e Qods Stadium (Vârzeshgah-e Sheheday-e Shiherqâds) is a football stadium in Shahr-e Qods, Tehran, Iran with a 18,000 seating capacity. It is currently the home stadium of Paykan and Rah Ahan.

Location
The stadium is located in Shahr-e Qods, near Karaj. Shahr-e Qods is the capital of Qods County, Tehran Province.

History
Shohada Shahr-e Qods Stadium was constructed by Municipality of Tehran in 2005. In mid-2006 Persepolis considered buying Shahr-e Ghods Stadium, but the deal fell through due to Persepolis' poor financial situation and the long distance between the city center and the stadium. In addition to a lack of interest from other teams playing their home games in this city, the stadium was not used many times.

In 2013 Paykan moved from Tehran to Shahr-e Qods. They played all their home games in the 2013–14 Azadegan League season in this Stadium. Paykan achieved promotion to Persian Gulf Pro League after 1–0 victory over Fajr Sepasi in Shahr-e Qods. Following the good support from the people of Shahr-e Qods, Paykan announced they will be playing in that city for the 2014–15 Persian Gulf Pro League season.

Because of a bad state of the stadium, it was renovated in 2014. Consequently, Paykan played their home games in the first half of the 2014–15 Persian Gulf Pro League season in Tehran's Takhti Stadium and Shahid Dastgerdi Stadium. Since January 2015 Paykan and Rah Ahan play their games in Shahr-e Qods.

References

Multi-purpose stadiums in Iran
Football venues in Iran
Buildings and structures in Tehran Province
Sport in Tehran Province